The Spartanburgers are a collegiate summer baseball team playing in the Coastal Plain League. The team plays its home games at Duncan Park in Spartanburg, South Carolina. The team, formerly the Gastonia Grizzlies, relocated from Gastonia, North Carolina for the 2021 season. The team name, announced in February 2021, is just the one word, not using the city name. On December 21, 2020 Wesley Brown was named head coach. The team played their first game on May 27, 2021, losing at home to the Lexington County Blowfish. In March 2022, the Spartanburgers suspended operations for the 2022 season.

References

External links
 Official Site
 Coastal Plain League

Coastal Plain League
Sports in Spartanburg, South Carolina
Amateur baseball teams in South Carolina
2021 establishments in South Carolina
Baseball teams established in 2021